
Year 561 (DLXI) was a common year starting on Saturday (link will display the full calendar) of the Julian calendar. The denomination 561 for this year has been used since the early medieval period, when the Anno Domini calendar era became the prevalent method in Europe for naming years.

Events 
<onlyinclude>

By place

Europe 
 November 29 – King Chlothar I ("the Old") dies at Compiègne at age 64. The Merovingian Dynasty is continued by his four sons (Charibert I, Guntram, Sigebert I and Chilperic I), who divide the Frankish Kingdom and rule from the capitals at Paris, Orléans, Reims and Soissons, respectively.

Britain 

 The Battle of Cúl Drebene (modern Ireland) is fought between the Northern and Southern Uí Néill (approximate date).

Asia 
 Winter – Wu Cheng Di succeeds his brother Xiao Zhao Di, who dies from injuries suffered while hunting, as Chinese emperor of Northern Qi.

Americas 
 Sky Witness is crowned as leader of Calakmul.

By topic

Religion 
 March 4 – Pope Pelagius I dies in Rome after a five-year reign, and is succeeded by John III as the 61st pope.
 Jnanagupta, a Buddhist monk from Gandhara (Pakistan), begins translating Buddhist texts into Chinese.
 The First Council of Braga is held. The council condemns the doctrine of Priscillianism.

Births 
 Yang Lihua, empress of Northern Zhou (d. 609)

Deaths 
 March 4 – Pope Pelagius I
 November 29 – Chlothar I, king of the Franks
 Aregund, queen of the Franks 
 Chram, Frankish prince and son of Chlothar I
 Fei Di, emperor of Northern Qi (b. 545)
 Xiao Zhao Di, emperor of Northern Qi (b. 535)

References